Bunny is a surname. Notable people with the surname include:

 Edmund Bunny (1540–1619), Calvinist theologian
 John Bunny (1862–1915), American silent film comedian
 Henry Bunny (1822–1891), New Zealand politician
Richard Bunny (disambiguation)
 Rupert Bunny (1864–1947), Australian painter

See also
 Bunney, another surname